Gillian Margaret Wachsman (born September 19, 1966) is an American former pair skater. With Todd Waggoner, she is the 1985 NHK Trophy champion, 1985 Skate America bronze medalist, and 1986 U.S. national champion. The pair competed at the 1988 Winter Olympics, placing fifth, and at three World Championships, placing as high as fourth.

Career 
Early in her career, Gillian Wachsman competed with Robert Daw. They placed fourth at the 1984 Skate America and won the pewter medal twice at the U.S. Championships.

Wachsman teamed up with Todd Waggoner in the autumn of 1984. In their first season together, they took the bronze medal at the U.S. Championships. The following season, the pair won bronze at the 1985 Skate America, gold at the 1985 NHK Trophy, and then gold at the 1986 U.S. Championships ahead of Jill Watson / Peter Oppegard. They were assigned to their first World Championships and finished seventh. The pair was coached by Pauline Williams.

After winning silver at the 1988 U.S. Championships, Wachsman/Waggoner were selected to represent the United States at the 1988 Winter Olympics. The pair placed fifth in Calgary. Their final amateur competition was the 1988 World Championships where they placed fourth. They retired in order to focus on their educations.

Results

With Todd Waggoner

With Robert Daw

References

1966 births
American female pair skaters
Olympic figure skaters of the United States
Figure skaters at the 1988 Winter Olympics
Living people
Sportspeople from Greenwich, Connecticut
People from Riverside, Connecticut
21st-century American women
20th-century American women